Leptogenys hysterica, is a species of ant of the subfamily Ponerinae. It is found in Borneo, India, Sri Lanka, and Thailand.

References

Animaldiversity.org
Itis.org

External links

 at antwiki.org

Ponerinae
Hymenoptera of Asia
Insects described in 1900